Magnolia iltisiana is a species of plant in the family Magnoliaceae. It is endemic to Mexico. Common names include ahuatoso and yoloxochitl.

Description
Magnolia iltisiana is a large evergreen tree. It grows up to 40 meters high. with a trunk up to 60–150 cm in diameter.

Range and habitat

Magnolia iltisiana is known from a few localities in the Sierra de Manantlán and Sierra de Cacoma in Jalisco state, and near Morelia in Michoacán, between 800 and 2,400 meters elevation.

In the Manantlán and Cacoma sierras, it grows in moist to very humid montane cloud forests, mostly in ravines and on drier south-facing steep slopes exposed to wind action. It is a canopy tree, and often found in association with oaks (Quercus spp.) and Acer binzayedii.

The species has an area of occupancy (AOO) of less than 500 km2.

Conservation
Magnolia iltisiana has a declining population, and suffers from habitat loss, chiefly from logging for timber and forest clearance for cattle pasture. Its conservation status is assessed as Vulnerable. The populations near Morelia in Michoacán are severely fragmented. The populations in the Cacoma and Manantlán sierras are less fragmented, and many are within the Sierra de Manantlán Biosphere Reserve protected area.

References

iltisiana
Endemic flora of Mexico
Vulnerable plants
Flora of the Trans-Mexican Volcanic Belt
Trees of Jalisco
Trees of Michoacán
Taxonomy articles created by Polbot
Cloud forest flora of Mexico